Divarilima is a genus of marine bivalve molluscs in the family Limidae, the file shells or file clams.

Species
 Divarilima albicoma (Dall, 1886) 
 Divarilima pellucida 
 Divarilima sydneyensis (Hedley, 1904)

References
 SealifeBase
 TePapa
 

Limidae
Bivalve genera